Ko Yin Fai (born 18 January 1960) is a Hong Kong fencer. He competed in the individual and team foil events at the 1984 Summer Olympics.

References

External links
 

1960 births
Living people
Hong Kong male foil fencers
Olympic fencers of Hong Kong
Fencers at the 1984 Summer Olympics
Fencers at the 1986 Asian Games
Asian Games competitors for Hong Kong
20th-century Hong Kong people